Ideographic Symbols and Punctuation is a Unicode block containing symbols and punctuation marks used by ideographic scripts such as Tangut and Nüshu.

History
The following Unicode-related documents record the purpose and process of defining specific characters in the Ideographic Symbols and Punctuation block:

See also 
 CJK Unified Ideographs
 CJK Symbols and Punctuation
 Khitan Small Script (Unicode block)
 Nushu (Unicode block)
 Tangut (Unicode block)
 Tangut Components (Unicode block)
 Tangut Supplement (Unicode block)

References 

Unicode blocks
Tangut script